Bridging integrator 3 is a protein that in humans is encoded by the BIN3 gene.

Function 

The product of this gene is a member of the BAR domain protein family. The encoded protein is composed solely of a BAR domain which is predicted to form coiled coil structures and proposed to mediate dimerization, sense and induce membrane curvature, and bind small GTPases. BAR domain proteins have been implicated in endocytosis, intracellular transport, and a diverse set of other processes.

References

External links

Further reading